Gadiv Petrochemical Industries Ltd. גדיב תעשיות פטרוכימיה בע"מ, is an Israeli petrochemical company, part of Bazan Group owned by Israel Corporation Ltd. Gadiv offices are located in Haifa, Israel. The company manufactures and markets over 500 thousand tons of petrochemical products each year including aromatics, aliphatic solvents and intermediates for the chemical, pharmaceutical, plastic and food industries. Gadiv is wholly owned by Oil Refineries Ltd.

History
Gadiv was established in 1974 in order to serve the plastics and chemical markets in Israel and neighboring countries in the Mediterranean basin. The plant was planned to produce a nameplate capacity of 170,000 mt, started operating in 1978 in Haifa. Over the last 30 years, Gadiv's production capacity has grown due to major technological upgrades to more than 500,000 mt per year. Oil Refineries Ltd. established full ownership in 1994.

Products
Aromatics:
Benzene
Toluene
Solvent Xylene
Orthoxylene
Paraxylene
Solgad 100 - Aromatic Light
Solvent Naphtha
Solgad 150 - Aromatic Heavy
Solvent Naphtha
Solgad 200 - Aromatic Super
Heavy Solvent Naphtha
Aliphatic Solvents:
Hexane
ISO Hexane
Heptane
Tailor-Made Solvents
Intermediates:
Phthalic Anhydride

References

Israel Petrochemicals Enterprises Joins Oil Refineries' Control Group
 duns 100
GPI sells off Gadiv to the Oil Refinery

External links
 Corporate Website
 Owner Website
 Bloomberg company profile

Companies based in Haifa
Petrochemical companies